Saskia Mary Bullen (born 20 July 1983) is a New Zealand former cricketer who played as a slow left-arm orthodox bowler. She appeared in three Twenty20 Internationals for New Zealand between 2009 and 2010. She played domestic cricket for Auckland.

References

External links
 
 

1983 births
Living people
Cricketers from Auckland
New Zealand women cricketers
New Zealand women Twenty20 International cricketers
Auckland Hearts cricketers